Roger de Lascelles (died 1297), Lord of Kirby Knowle, was an English noble.

Roger was a son of Thomas de Maunby and Avice de Lascelles. He adopted the name and arms of Lascelles. He was summoned to Parliament between 1295 and his death in 1297.

Marriage and issue
He married Isabel and had the following known issue:
Maud de Lascelles, married firstly William Hilton and secondly Robert Tilliol.
Theophania de Lascelles, married Ralph FitzRandolph.
Johanna de Lascelles, married Thomas de Culwen.
Avicia de Lascelles, married Robert Constable of Halsham.

Citations

References
 
 
 

Year of birth unknown
1297 deaths
13th-century English people